{{Taxobox
| name = Drymaplaneta semivitta
| image = Drymaplaneta_semivitta.jpg
| image_width = 200px
| image_caption = Drymaplaneta semivitta
| regnum = Animalia
| phylum = Arthropoda
| classis = Insecta
| ordo = Blattodea
| familia = Blattidae
| genus = Drymaplaneta| species = D. semivitta| binomial = Drymaplaneta semivitta| binomial_authority = Walker, 1868
}}Drymaplaneta semivitta is a species of cockroach native to Australia and introduced to New Zealand. In New Zealand, it is known as the Gisborne cockroach, after the city of Gisborne where it was first discovered in the country.

Distinctive features
One of the larger cockroaches, Drymaplaneta semivitta is about 20–45mm long and 12–15mm wide. It is a glossy dark brown, with distinctive tan or white coloured translucent stripes along each side of its head. Unlike many cockroaches, it has no vestigial wings.

In males, the third and fourth maxillary palps are enlarged, and the hind tibiae are flattened and expanded.

Habitat and dietD. semivitta is often found in wood material, such as timber or bark chips. It feeds off organic material but does not normally infest food. In cold weather, it can be found in roof cavities and the empty spaces between walls. D. semivitta is generally regarded as harmless.

 Biology 
Hex-2-enal is present in the defensive secretions of D. semivitta. This chemical also occurs in some other species of Drymaplaneta.

RangeD. semivitta'' is most often found in Melbourne, Sydney, and throughout the North Island of New Zealand, and also in Nelson and Blenheim, although it has been found as far south as Timaru.

References

Cockroaches
Insects of Australia
Insects of New Zealand
Insects described in 1868